2nd Smirnovka is a rural locality (a settlement) in Smirnovskoye Rural Settlement of Solnechnogorsky District, Russia. The population was 68 as of 2010.

Geography 
2nd Smirnovka is located 8 km northwest of Solnechnogorsk (the district's administrative centre) by road. Moshnitsy is the nearest rural locality.

Streets 
 Dachnaya
 Kirpichnogo zavoda

References

External links 
 2nd Smirnovka on komandirovka.ru

Rural localities in Moscow Oblast
Solnechnogorsky District